Roger Fry: A Biography is a biography of Roger Fry written by Virginia Woolf.

External links
 

Books by Virginia Woolf
Hogarth Press books